Bojhena Se Bojhena (2015) is a Bangladeshi romantic action film written, produced and directed by Montazur Rahman Akbar. Starring Akash Khan, Achol, Amit Hasan. The film was released by Nayan-Apon Productions. The film starred Akash Khan.

Story 
The story involved the Mirja and Chowdhury families. Achol Mirja had 3 brothers. Kabila Chowdhury fell in love with Achol. Achol returned to her village with her brothers, where she fell in love with Akash.

Cast 
 Akash Khan 
 Achol
 Prabir Mitra
 Rehana Jolly
 Amit Hasan 
 Fakira
 Kabila
 Katha

References

External links 
 Bojhena Se Bojhena in Imdb
 বোঝেনা সে বোঝেনা  in bmdb

2015 films
2015 romantic drama films
Bengali-language Bangladeshi films
Bangladeshi romantic drama films
2010s Bengali-language films
Films directed by Montazur Rahman Akbar